COSCO Glory is a container ship. She was built in 2011 by Hyundai Heavy Industries of South Korea and is owned by Seaspan and has been chartered on a 12-year, fixed-rate time charter to the German branch of Cosco Container Lines Europe, starting on June 10, 2011. Cosco Container Lines is now part of COSCO Shipping Lines.

Cosco Glory was initially deployed on the NE3 service, travelling from Asia to Europe and back once a week. On this service, the sequence of ports visited is Rotterdam, Felixstowe, Hamburg, Antwerp, Guangzhou, Hong Kong, Xingang, Dalian, Qingdao, Ningbo, Yantian, and Singapore.
The Cosco Glory is an ungeared, post-Panamax vessel.

Sister ships
Cosco Development
Cosco Excellence
Cosco Faith
Cosco Fortune
Cosco Harmony
Cosco Hope
Cosco Pride

References

External links 

 COSCO 

Ships of COSCO Shipping
Container ships
2011 ships
Ships built by Hyundai Heavy Industries Group